P. canina may refer to:
 Patagonotothen canina, a fish species in the genus Patagonotothen
 Peltigera canina, a lichen species in the genus Peltigera
 "Plectranthus canina", an incorrect name for the plant species Coleus comosus
 Plectranthus caninus, a synonym of the plant species Coleus caninus

See also
 Canina (disambiguation)